John Samuel Inman (born November 26, 1962) is an American professional golfer and college men's golf head coach. He is the younger brother of professional golfer Joe Inman.

Inman was born in Greensboro, North Carolina, where he graduated from Grimsley High School in 1980. He attended the University of North Carolina at Chapel Hill from 1980–1984, and was a distinguished member of the golf team – a three-time All-American. In his senior year, Inman received the Haskins Award given annually to the college player of the year. He was the individual medalist in the 1984 NCAA Division I Championship. His 17 under par performance in that tournament broke the record set 13 years earlier by Ben Crenshaw and stood until 2000, when it was bettered by the 23-under-par performance of Oklahoma State's Charles Howell III.

Inman turned professional in 1985 and played full-time on the PGA Tour from 1987–1996 and won two events. His first win came in the 1987 Provident Classic by one stroke over Bill Glasson and Rocco Mediate. Inman's second win came during a 5-man playoff at the 1993 Buick Southern Open. His best finish in a major championship was T-14 at the 1990 U.S. Open.

After his tour playing days were over, Inman returned to his alma mater in July 1998 to take over the reins of the men's golf program. He has shown himself to be an innovator in respect to making emerging technology and applications available to his players.

In 2011, Inman decided to return to professional golf and play in the Nationwide Tour's Rex Hospital Open. The two-time PGA Tour winner will play on the Nationwide Tour until he is eligible to compete in the Champions Tour.

Amateur wins (4)
1982 Eastern Amateur
1984 NCAA Division I Championship, Western Amateur
1985 Azalea Invitational

Professional wins (2)

PGA Tour wins (2)

PGA Tour playoff record (1–0)

Results in major championships 

Note: Inman never played in The Open Championship.

CUT = missed the half-way cut
"T" = tied

U.S. national team appearances
Amateur
Eisenhower Trophy: 1984

See also
1986 PGA Tour Qualifying School graduates
1990 PGA Tour Qualifying School graduates
1991 PGA Tour Qualifying School graduates

References

External links

American male golfers
North Carolina Tar Heels men's golfers
PGA Tour golfers
PGA Tour Champions golfers
Golfers from North Carolina
College golf coaches in the United States
Sportspeople from Greensboro, North Carolina
Grimsley High School alumni
1962 births
Living people